The USSR women's national football team represented the Soviet Union in international women's football. The team was controlled by the Football Federation of the Soviet Union. It was founded in 1990, so it was a short-lived national team due to the dissolution of the Soviet Union the following year. Oleg Lapshin served as the team's coach during its 20 months of existence. Socially conservative views in the Soviet Union negatively affected the development of women's football in the country.

Background
Following a letter published in 1972 in the magazine journal Zdorovye complaining about a women's football tournament being held in Dnipropetrovsk, Nina Graevskaya, head of the USSR Federation of Sports Medicine, replied that holding such competitions was inexpedient, arguing that playing football posed a danger to the female body because of the size of its heart, bones and pelvis and its spine and joint's degree of mobility. One month later the State Committee for Physical Culture and Sport issued a ban on women's football, along with women's boxing and wrestling.

History
The Soviet team played its first match on 26 March 1990 against Bulgaria in Kazanlak. A. Bezmenova, Tatyana Verezubova and Irina Gnutova made it a 4–1 win. Two weeks later they played their first match on Soviet soil, a 0–0 draw against Norway in Sevastopol. The Soviet women's national team didn't take part in the 1991 UEFA Women's Championship qualification, instead playing friendly matches.

The USSR was accepted for the 1993 UEFA Women's Championship, which would have marked its first appearance in an official women's football tournament. The Soviet national team played its only official game on 6 October 1991, a 2–1 win over Hungary. They would play their final match a month before their next qualification game, ending their short existence with a balance of 9 wins, 9 draws and 21 losses. The second qualification game was played in May 1992 after the break-up of the USSR Football Federation, with the debuting Russia women's national team representing the new Russian Federation.

References

1990 establishments in the Soviet Union
1991 disestablishments in the Soviet Union
Former national association football teams in Europe
women
Women's football in Russia
European women's national association football teams